Sphragisticus is a genus of dirt-colored seed bugs in the family Rhyparochromidae. There is one described species in Sphragisticus, S. nebulosus.

References

External links

 

Rhyparochromidae
Articles created by Qbugbot